SS Fingal was a Norwegian merchant ship of 2,137 tons which was sunk during World War II off the coast of Australia.

Brief history
Fingal was built at Moss Værft, Norway 1923.

In December 1941, the steamer had been damaged by Japanese bombing when en route between Rangoon and Calcutta.

In May 1943, Fingal was under charter to the Australian Government.

At about 1:35pm off Nambucca Heads, New South Wales on 5 May 1943, two torpedoes fired from the Japanese submarine I-180 struck the side of her hull. Fingal sank within a minute and Patterson dropped depth charges and immediately left the area.

Survivors from the sinking ship clung to debris. A RAAF Avro Anson DG696 from No. 71 Squadron, crewed by Sergeant Geoffery Gillmore (pilot), Flying Officer Max Sharrad (Navigator) and Sergeant J "Poppa" Hall (WAG), operating out of Coffs Harbour was escorting her at the time, flying about  ahead of the ship. DG696 saw that she had been hit by a torpedo, returned to the area, found the survivors and advised Patterson. The survivors were picked up after spending four hours in the sea; 19 of the crew survived. Patterson dropped off the survivors at Newcastle at 9:00am on 6 May 1943.

Twelve men were killed in the sinking, including the captain, chief officer and all the engineers.

References

External links

Ships built in Moss, Norway
Steamships of Norway
1923 ships
1943 in Australia
Shipwrecks of the Mid North Coast Region
Ships sunk by Japanese submarines
World War II shipwrecks in the Pacific Ocean
World War II merchant ships of Australia
Iron and steel steamships of Australia
Maritime incidents in May 1943